is a 2003 Japanese film directed by Ryūichi Hiroki. It is based on the 1999 book of the same name by writer Mari Akasaka.

Plot

After meeting a handsome truck driver (Nao Omori) in an urban mini-mart, a 30-something freelance writer (Shinobu Terajima) embarks on a life-changing emotional journey of sexual discovery.

Cast
Shinobu Terajima
Nao Omori
Tomorowo Taguchi
Masahiro Toda
Eriko Takayanagi
Riho Makise
Miki Sakajo
Jun Murakami
Eugene Nomura

Awards and nominations
25th Yokohama Film Festival
 Won: Best Film
 Won: Best Director - Ryūichi Hiroki
 Won: Best Screenplay - Haruhiko Arai
 Won: Best Actress - Shinobu Terajima
 Won: Best Supporting Actor - Nao Ōmori

References

External links

2003 films
Films directed by Ryūichi Hiroki
Japanese drama films
2000s Japanese-language films
2000s Japanese films